Knox Township is one of the nineteen townships of Guernsey County, Ohio, United States. As of the 2010 census the population was 566.

Geography
Located in the northwestern part of the county, it borders the following townships:
Wheeling Township - northeast
Liberty Township - east
Cambridge Township - southeast
Adams Township - south
Highland Township, Muskingum County - southwest corner
Monroe Township, Muskingum County - west
Linton Township, Coshocton County - northwest

No municipalities are located in Knox Township.

Name and history
Knox Township was established in 1819. It is one of five Knox Townships statewide.

Government
The township is governed by a three-member board of trustees, who are elected in November of odd-numbered years to a four-year term beginning on the following January 1. Two are elected in the year after the presidential election and one is elected in the year before it. There is also an elected township fiscal officer, who serves a four-year term beginning on April 1 of the year after the election, which is held in November of the year before the presidential election. Vacancies in the fiscal officership or on the board of trustees are filled by the remaining trustees.

References

External links
County website

Townships in Guernsey County, Ohio
Townships in Ohio